A racecourse is a horse racing track.

Racecourse may also refer to:

 Race Course, Vadodara, Gujarat, India
 Race Course, Clarendon, Jamaica
 Racecourse station (MTR), a station on the East Rail Line of Hong Kong
 Racecourse-class minesweeper, a United Kingdom naval ship class
 The Racecourse, a cricket and general sports ground at Durham University, England
 The Racecourse, Northampton, England
Racecourse Bay, South Australia, a locality in the local government area of the District Council of Grant

See also

 Racecourse Ground (disambiguation)
 Racecourse Cemetery
 Racecourse Road